Partial general elections were held in Belgium on 13 June 1854. In the elections for the Chamber of Representatives the Liberal Party and Catholics won 54 seats each. Voter turnout was 61%, although only 45,884 people were eligible to vote.

Under the alternating system, elections were only held in five out of the nine provinces: Antwerp, Brabant, Luxembourg, Namur and West Flanders.

Results

Chamber of Representatives

References

1850s elections in Belgium
General
Belgium
Belgium